Casey House or variations such as Casey Farm may refer to:

in Canada
Casey House (Toronto, Ontario) a hospice for people with AIDS

in the United States

Casey House (Mountain Home, Arkansas), listed on the National Register of Historic Places (NRHP)
Patrick Casey House, Aitkin, Minnesota, listed on the NRHP
Silas Casey Farm, North Kingstown, Rhode Island, listed on the NRHP
Casey House (Georgetown, Texas), listed on the NRHP in Texas